Star Smile Strong is Ian McNabb's eleventh solo studio album, released in April 2017. In March, McNabb had previously released the entirety of the album online, on his SoundCloud profile.

Track listing
 "Mystic Age" (featuring Professor Brian Cox) – 8:01
 "Can't Get What I Want" – 3:13
 "How She Moves" – 2:58
 "Waitin' for a Streetcar" – 2:48
 "Enabler" – 4:24
 "Lazy Water" – 4:26
 "I Kinda Like It Without You" – 5:01
 "Hotter than the Sun" – 4:43
 "Women Love a Bastard – Men Love a Bitch" – 3:38
 "Wanna Change My Plea to Guilty" – 3:55
 "This Love I Feel for You" – 3:17
 "Clarabella – Come to the Window" – 12:42

Critical reception
Star Smile Strong received positive acclaim upon release. Nick Hall of Fatea magazine states that 'It almost seems like lazy writing to point out that, in a parallel universe somewhere, Ian is striding the world stages like a U2-sized behemoth, and that it's criminal that, in this universe, he's not. However, those in the know (a large catchment that is ever-growing, actually), know that - as well as being one of our most charismatic live performers, Ian McNabb is up there as one of the finest singer-songwriters and guitarists that these isles have ever produced. This album will delight that large, growing fan-base and should, with the aid of word-of-mouth, draw even more people in.' Similarly, Nigel Cartner of Sonic Bandwagon noted that 'This is a highly recommended album – one of the best of the year from a man who’s no stranger to producing excellence throughout his illustrious career.'

References

Ian McNabb albums
2017 albums